Jinjing may refer to:

Jinjing, Hunan, a town.
Qin Jinjing (born 1996), China-born Australian badminton player
Zhang Jinjing, born in 1977, Chinese gymnast.